Ramón Flores may refer to:
 Ramón Flores (baseball), Venezuelan baseball player
 Ramón Flores (footballer) (born 1982), Salvadoran footballer
 Ramón Flores (trumpet player), Mexican trumpet player